Asian Wave is a 2012 Chinese reality singing talent show featuring contestants from many different Asian countries. The show premiered on 11 July 2012 on Dragon Television.

On 20 September 2012, Malaysian singer-songwriter Shila Amzah won the competition by unanimous vote, after performing 3 songs (in the final rounds) in 3 languages (Malay, English and Mandarin).

Format
The first 16 episodes, first shown between 11 July 2012 and 30 August 2012, feature competitions amongst 66 Greater China contestants (including music groups). Competition was so strong that established singer Fiona Fung from Hong Kong failed to reach even the Final 16. In the end, the 6 finalists were selected (in order of finish):
 Chang Shilei
 Sun Bolun (孙伯纶)
 Liang Yi-chen (梁一貞)
 Guo Yifan (郭一凡)
 Henry Huo
 Yu Chaoying (余超颖) & Guo Meizi (郭美孜)

They qualified to the Asian Region contest for a chance to compete with 18 contestants from the rest of Asia.

 Anirudh Bhola
 Priyanka Negi & Bhavin Dhanak
 Tia Kar
 Flow
 Emi Tawata
 Shila Amzah
 Athena Beh (马嘉轩)
 Lau Wan Yin (刘婉滢)
 By2
 Rachel Chua (蔡艾珈)
 Kelvin Tan
 7942
 Cross Gene
 ZE:A
 Whee (휘)
 Techin Chayuti (จิรัฐชัย ชยุติ)
 Ten Nararak (นรารักษ์ ใจบำรุง)
 Ploy (พลอย) & Gun Achi (กัน อชิ)

Preliminary rounds
The preliminary rounds of the Asian-wide competition consist of 6 episodes and were first aired from 3 September 2012 to 19 September 2012.

In each group of 8 contestants, 4 will advance to the final rounds.

In Round 1, eight contestants are divided into 4 pairs, with the 4 winners directly advancing to Round 2. Then the judges do a second round of voting to determine the best 2 contestants among the 4 losers. Then, the remaining 2 contestants do a 30-second a cappella battle to determine the last contestant to advance.

In Round 2, the 4 winners from Round 1 are divided into 2 pairs, with the 2 winners directly advancing to the final rounds. Then the judges do a second round of voting to determine the better contestant between the 2 losers. Later, the best contestant from the 3 losers from Round 1 does a 30-second a cappella battle with the remaining winner from Round 1, to determine the last contestant to advance.

Group one
Round 1

Round 2

Group two 
Round 1

Round 2

Group three 
Round 1

Round 2

Extra battle: judges could not decide between the Indian duo and the Chinese duo who both lost their first battle in Round 2.

Final rounds
The final 3 rounds were broadcast live on 20 September 2012. Before the competition, some of the previously eliminated contestants performed; as well as invitees Jam Hsiao from Taiwan and Michael Wong from Malaysia.

Likely due to the violent anti-Japanese demonstrations in China at the time, Japan's Emi Tawata and South Korea's Cross Gene (which includes a Japanese member) had to withdraw from the final rounds. As a result, only 10 of the originally selected 12 finalists remain, and after Round 1 the judges do a second round of voting to select one of the five battle losers to advance to Round 2.

Round 1

Round 2

Round 3

International broadcasting

See also
 Voice of Asia
 Asia New Singer Competition

References

External links

Singing talent shows
Chinese television shows
2012 Chinese television series debuts